The MagnifiScience Centre (MSC) is an independent science center in Karachi, with a mission to develop among the populace an interest in scientific thinking, scientific literacy, and scientific methods through engagement with interactive exhibits and programmes.

The MSC’s multistorey building, located in the City Railway Colony of Saddar, opened to the public in September 2021. Following its vision "science is for everyone", MSC promotes scientific literacy through experiential informal learning channels which spark curiosity, and encourage critical thinking and problem-solving. The MSC aims to remove barriers to STEM education for the public, particularly for marginalised communities and differently abled persons.

The Science Centre features over 200 interactive exhibits that enable visitors to get a hands-on understanding of different science concepts and relate them to daily life.

The MagnifiScience Centre is a project and run by The Dawood Foundation, a not-for-profit organisation, certified by the Pakistan Centre for Philanthropy (PCP).

Origins of MagnifiScience

In 2016, The Dawood Foundation conducted its first science exhibition, called MagnifiScience exhibition at the Dawood Public School. Due to its success, it was held again the following year at the same premises. Thereafter, Pakistan's first science studio - TDF MagnifiScience Children's Studio - was opened in 2018. 
In October 2018, a science exhibition was held in Islamkot, Sindh. An increasing need for a larger space led to the start of the construction of the building in 2019.

In November 2021, the President of Pakistan, Dr Arif Alvi, officially inaugurated the Science Centre.

Building architecture 

The Science Centre building spread over ground-plus-three-floor has been designed Madiha Ghani of Shahab Ghani and Associates. The MSC is a pre-engineered building, which is seismically sound, and conceptualised to minimise environmental impact. As part of its green initiatives, the premises feature a solar power system and a wastewater recycling system.

Interior and exhibitions 

The over 200 exhibits across the floors showcase different themes addressing various scientific topics and concepts that are pertinent in the Pakistani context. These include different architectural and cultural elements of Karachi, sources of food, constructions and modes of transportation. The facility also covers the themes of human body, light, sound, illusions, mathematics, and physics including renewable energy and telecommunication.

In addition to the main exhibition areas, there is also a simulation of mangrove ecosystem installed inside the building which highlights the importance of native flora and fauna along Pakistan’s coastline.

In the centre’s auditorium, science-related documentaries are screened as well as science-related program and workshops are held on a regular basis.

Outdoor areas 

The original property of the science centre was formerly a colonial warehouse building located within the historic Railway Quarter. Adjacent to the property, passes the Karachi Circular Railway and the adjoining areas have a series of warehouses constructed during the British Raj. The site was originally owned by Ralli Brothers Ltd in 1888. Today, the only remains of the warehouse are the stone boundary walls around the entire venue and a gatehouse which have been restored to bring back their original character as much as possible.

The outdoor area comprises also the centre’s Science Garden which features a playground, a natural maze and many indigenous trees and plants.

In front of the building are a few outdoor exhibits, games, and a pond featuring science-related-information about its organisms living within.

References

External Links
 MagnifiScience Centre
 The Dawood Foundation

See also
Would you still consider science boring after visiting this place?, BBC Urdu (8 December 2021) 

2021 establishments in Pakistan
Museums established in 2021 
Museums in Karachi
Museums in Sindh
Science centers
Science museums in Pakistan
Tourist attractions in Karachi